Perica Ivetić (born 28 November 1986) is a Bosnian professional footballer who plays as a defender or as a midfielder for First League of RS club Rudar Prijedor.

Career statistics

Club

References

External links
PrvaLiga profile 

1986 births
Living people
Sportspeople from Livno
Serbs of Bosnia and Herzegovina
Association football midfielders
Bosnia and Herzegovina footballers
Bosnia and Herzegovina youth international footballers
Bosnia and Herzegovina under-21 international footballers
FK Borac Banja Luka players
NK Bela Krajina players
FK Laktaši players
FK BSK Banja Luka players
FK Velež Mostar players
FK Olimpik players
FC Koper players
FK Sloboda Tuzla players 
FK Sarajevo players
NK Vinogradar players
FK Rudar Prijedor players
Premier League of Bosnia and Herzegovina players
Slovenian Second League players
Slovenian PrvaLiga players
Second Football League (Croatia) players
First League of the Republika Srpska players
Bosnia and Herzegovina expatriate footballers
Expatriate footballers in Slovenia
Bosnia and Herzegovina expatriate sportspeople in Slovenia
Expatriate footballers in Croatia
Bosnia and Herzegovina expatriate sportspeople in Croatia